The Spearfish torpedo (formally Naval Staff Target 7525) is the heavy torpedo used by the submarines of the Royal Navy. It can be guided by wire or by autonomous active or passive sonar, and provides both anti-submarine warfare (ASW) and anti-surface warfare (ASuW) capability.  Spearfish development began in the 1970s, with production starting in 1988, and deployment in 1992. By 2004, the new weapon had completely replaced the older Tigerfish torpedo. It is one of the most advanced torpedoes in the world.

Design
The torpedo is driven by a pump-jet coupled to a Hamilton Sundstrand 21TP04 gas turbine engine using Otto fuel II and hydroxyl ammonium perchlorate as oxidiser. The addition of an oxidiser improves the specific energy of the fuel by reducing the fuel-richness of the Otto fuel.

A microprocessor enables the torpedo to make autonomous tactical decisions during the attack. It has a powerful blast warhead, triggered by either contact detonation (against a submarine hull) or an acoustic proximity fuse (for under-keel detonation against ships). A standoff detonation under the keel enhances blast effects against surface ships through the amplification of stress resulting from the interaction of the explosion's products and the flexible structure of the ship.

Guidance
In a typical engagement, Spearfish will run out wire-guided to the general vicinity of the target and then conduct a covert passive search.  The high-capacity guide wire system, specifically designed to match the Spearfish's manoeuvre and speed envelope, provides two-way data exchange between the torpedo and launch submarine, maximising the submarine's organic sensor and combat control capabilities.

Once at close range the Spearfish uses active sonar to classify and home in on its target.  High-power transmissions and sophisticated signal processing enable Spearfish to accurately discriminate targets from background noise and ensure high resistance to acoustic countermeasures and/or evasive manoeuvres.

Should Spearfish fail to hit the target on its first attack, it automatically selects an appropriate re-attack mode until it successfully concludes the engagement.

Testing
Tactical software has been extensively refined through real-time, hardware in the loop simulations and demonstrated in more than 500 in-water trials and exercise firings.

Production
The production contract for the Spearfish Torpedo was placed with GEC-Marconi Underwater Systems Ltd (now BAE Systems) in 1983, following a development programme lasting several years.  Spearfish entered full production in 1988.

Deployment
The first Spearfish were deployed in 1992, with deliveries completed in 2003; the number ordered has not been revealed. Spearfish torpedoes are stored and serviced at Beith Ordnance Storage facility in North Ayrshire.

Upgrade
In 2009, an upgrade programme began, leading to further sophisticated advances in Spearfish's homing, warheads, tactical and fuelling systems, as well as an upgraded guidance link. This will last until 2019.

On 15 December 2014, the Ministry of Defence awarded BAE Systems a £270 million contract to upgrade the Spearfish torpedo. The upgrade includes a new insensitive-munition warhead from TDW, a change to the fuel system to improve safety, full digitisation of the weapon and a new fibre optic guidance link to improve performance. The upgraded 'MOD 1' torpedoes will enter service between 2020 and 2024. In February 2021  test fired 3 upgraded 'MOD 1' specification Spearfish torpedoes as part of their final testing before entry into service with the Royal Navy.

See also
 Mark 48 torpedo
 Black Shark torpedo
 DM2A4 heavyweight torpedo
 Yu-6 torpedo
 Varunastra (torpedo)

References

External links
 Spearfish Torpedo

Cold War weapons of the United Kingdom
Torpedoes of the United Kingdom
Naval weapons of the United Kingdom
BAE Systems weapons systems
General Electric Company
Weapons and ammunition introduced in 1992